Sahana  is a village in Chanditala II community development block of Srirampore subdivision in Hooghly district in the Indian state of West Bengal.

Geography
Chanditala police station serves this Village.

Gram panchayat
Villages and census towns in Kapasaria gram panchayat are: Kapashanria, Okardaha, Sahana, Sanka and Tisa.

Demographics
As per 2011 Census of India, Sahana had a total population of 1,944 of which 921 (47%) were males and 1,023 (53%) were females. Population below 6 years was 263. The total number of literates in Sahana was 1,340 (79.71% of the population over 6 years).

Transport

The main road is NH-19 (old number NH 2)/ Durgapur Exptressway. It is the main artery of the village.

References 

Villages in Chanditala II CD Block